Darko Živanović (born 25 February 1987) is a Serbian long-distance runner.

Before he started to train athletics in 2006, he practised wrestling and football. His coach is Vlastimir "Vlasta" Stevanović.

In his career, he ran two marathons. At the 2012 Rotterdam Marathon, he ran his personal best of 2:17:10, which was enough for the Olympic B standards. He represented Serbia at the 2012 Summer Olympics but didn't finish the race.

References

External links
 
 
 Profile at Tilastopaja OY
 Interview at Politika.rs 
 
 
  (archive)

1987 births
Living people
Serbian male steeplechase runners
Serbian male long-distance runners
Serbian male marathon runners
Olympic athletes of Serbia
Athletes (track and field) at the 2012 Summer Olympics
Sportspeople from Kragujevac
21st-century Serbian people